is a compilation album by Japanese idol girl group Morning Musume. It was the group's 8th compilation album and was released in Japan on March 20, 2019 with three versions: one regular edition and two limited editions. It includes members from their 2019 lineup as well as their "OG" alumni dating back 2007.

Featured lineup

Morning Musume '19 
 9th generation: Mizuki Fukumura, Erina Ikuta
 10th generation: Ayumi Ishida, Masaki Sato
 11th generation: Sakura Oda
 12th generation: Miki Nonaka, Maria Makino, Akane Haga
 13th generation: Kaede Kaga, Reina Yokoyama
 14th generation: Chisaki Morito

Morning Musume OG
 5th generation: Ai Takahashi, Risa Niigaki
 6th generation: Eri Kamei, Sayumi Michishige, Reina Tanaka
 7th generation: Koharu Kusumi
 8th generation: Aika Mitsui, Junjun, Linlin
 9th generation: Riho Sayashi, Kanon Suzuki
 10th generation: Haruna Iikubo, Haruka Kudo
 12th generation: Haruna Ogata

Track listing

Rank and Sales

References

External links 
 Album details on the Hello! Project official site
 Album details on the Up-Front Works official site

2019 compilation albums
Morning Musume albums
Zetima albums
Japanese-language albums
Albums produced by Tsunku
Dance-pop albums by Japanese artists
Electropop albums